Highway 655 is a secondary highway in the Cochrane District in Northern Ontario. It is heavily used by trucks as a critical access road to Timmins. The highway is one of the widest (by lane width), best-maintained secondary highways in the north (more comparable to a Kings Highway), and has the distinction of being Ontario's only secondary highway that features a 90 km/h (55 mph) speed limit, due to its importance and high design standards.

Route description 
Highway 655 begins at Highway 101 in Timmins, where it travels north, generally paralleling a high-voltage transmission line.

Like other provincial routes in Ontario, Highway655 is maintained by the Ministry of Transportation of Ontario. In 2020, traffic surveys conducted by the ministry showed that on average, 8,950vehicles used the highway daily along the  section between Highway101 (Algonquin Boulevard) and Ross Avenue in Timmins while 1,200vehicles did so each day along the section north of the Kidd Creek Mine at Kidd Creek Mine Road, the highest and lowest counts along the highway, respectively.

History 
Opened in 1965, it was originally known as the Texas Gulf Highway, and ended at the entrance to the Texas Gulf Mining Complex.
It was expanded from its original  length to its current length in 1979, creating a more efficient link between Timmins and northern communities along Highway 11 such as Smooth Rock Falls, Cochrane and Kapuskasing.

Major intersections

See also 
 List of Ontario provincial highways

References

External links 
 Highway 655
 Ontario Highways 636-673

655
Roads in Cochrane District
Transport in Timmins